Gang of Youths are an Australian alternative rock band from Sydney, now based in London, that formed in 2011. The group consists of David Le'aupepe, Max Dunn, Jung Kim, Donnie Berzestowski and Tom Hobden. Their debut studio album, The Positions (2015), received multiple ARIA Award nominations and peaked at number five on the Australian Albums Chart. It spawned certified platinum single "Magnolia", which has been described as their breakthrough hit. In 2017, the band released their second album, Go Farther in Lightness, preceded by their first Australian top 50 single "Let Me Down Easy". The album debuted at number one in Australia and was nominated for eight awards at the 2017 ARIA Music Awards, winning four – Album of the Year, Best Group, Best Rock Album, and Producer of the Year. In the Triple J Hottest 100 of 2017, the album held three positions in the top 10, a feat only achieved twice before.

Their third studio album, Angel in Realtime, was released in 2022 and debuted at number one in Australia and number 10 on the UK Albums Chart. Nominated in three categories at the 2022 ARIA Awards, it won Australian Album of the Year at the 2022 J Awards and was preceded by their comeback single, "The Angel of 8th Ave.", which became their second Australian top 50 single. The album's accompanying EP, Immolation Tape, followed in May 2022 featuring acoustic renditions of the album.

History

2011–2012: Formation

Gang of Youths were formed in Sydney, Australia in 2011, with original drummer, Sam O'Donnell. Le'aupepe and original lead guitarist, Joji Malani, first met in 2002, both aged 10, attending Hillsong, an evangelical church in northern Sydney. In subsequent years, they befriended O'Donnell and Chicago-born Kim at the church's youth group. Although Le'aupepe described himself during this time as a 'loner' and stated that while "I still align myself with Jesus," he was "just not a great poster-boy for it." In 2008, after leaving his previous school, Le'aupepe started attending the more prestigious Mosman High School, where he continued performing his own songs at school concerts, along with Harley Streten (soon to be known as Flume). Also, at Mosman High was Kiwi Max Dunn, who befriended Le'aupepe during their final year of high school in 2009.

The band's first gig was at Sydney's Hibernian House on 21 June 2012, supporting local band Tigertown. Tigertown's drummer Kurt Bailey was so impressed with the performance that he later became their manager. For the next 5 months, the band practiced and recorded some demos until their next gig in late December of that year. They started playing regular support gigs in small Sydney venues and local community station. FBi Radio began playing some of their demos, including "A Sudden Light" and "Strange Diseases". Word started filtering out about their impressive live show and on 27 February 2013, they played their first headline show, at the re- opening of Sydney nightclub Candy's Apartment. They released their first single "Evangelists" on 16 August 2013 and were featured on national youth station Triple J's Unearthed segment. They then embarked on a national tour, supporting Cloud Control.

2013–2016: The Positions and Let Me Be Clear

They started work on their debut album, The Positions, in 2013. In September that year, some tracks were recorded in New York's Marcarta Recording studio with Kevin McMahon. By June 2014, they were in the Sony Music Australia recording studios in Sydney. Drums on the album were shared by O'Donnell, Novacastrian Dom "Donnie" Borzestowski as well as session drummer, Joel van Gastel. In October 2014, O'Donnell left the band and was replaced by Borzestowski. Le'aupepe is the sole songwriter and his lyrics on The Positions tells the tale of his relationship with his former wife, her melanoma diagnosis and treatment for the cancer, their separation and his suicide attempts.

The band performed with Kean Edwards at South by Southwest festival in March 2014. The Positions peaked at No. 5 on the ARIA Albums Chart in May 2015. At the ARIA Music Awards of 2015, Gang of Youths received five nominations: Breakthrough Artist – Release, Best Rock Album, Best Cover Artist (by Nathan Johnson) for The Positions, Engineer of the Year (Adrian Breakspear, Peter Holz) for "Radioface", and Best Australian Live Act for the Gang of Youths National Tour. In December, they were recognised as the Live Act of the Year of 2015 and Best Domestic Tour in The AU Review. Their single "Magnolia" came in at number 21 in the Triple J Hottest 100, 2015.

In June 2016, a single, "Strange Diseases", was released, followed on 29 July by the six track EP Let Me Be Clear. The 5 original songs on Let Me Be Clear were originally written as part of material for The Positions, whilst the 6th track was a cover of "Both Sides, Now" by Joni Mitchell.  The band played at Splendour in the Grass in the same month.

2017–2018: Go Farther in Lightness 

In February 2017, the band finished recording their second album-- Go Farther in Lightness with a release date announced as 18 August. They then relocated to London amidst issues with the renewal of keyboardist Jung Kim's Australian Visa. In April and May, the band toured the UK and Europe, followed by a June tour of the US.  An Australian national tour in September followed the release of Go Farther in Lightness, after which the band returned to London for another UK/Europe tour in October. Three tracks from Go Farther in Lightness were voted into the Triple J Hottest 100, 2017, taking out 2nd, 5th and 10th in the countdown. Their song, "The Heart Is a Muscle", was used by Fox Sports (Australia) to promote the 2018 NRL season.

On 12 March 2018, the group made their US television debut featuring on Late Night with Seth Meyers, performing their single "What Can I Do If the Fire Goes Out?" In July 2018, the band were the first artist to perform on MTV Unplugged Australia. The concert was recorded at the Cobblestone Pavilion in Melbourne's Metropolitan Meat Market and released on 26 October 2018. On 30 September 2018, they played before the NRL Grand Final in front of a crowd of 82,688 at ANZ Stadium in Sydney. The band supported Foo Fighters for 7 nights in the US during their Concrete and Gold Tour in October 2018, and Mumford & Sons for 16 nights during the European leg of their Delta Tour in April/May 2019, and the US and Mexican leg in September/October of 2019.

2019–present: Total Serene and Angel in Realtime

In September 2019, Le'aupepe announced that the band's long-awaited third studio album would be released in 2020. He added that the lyrics of the album will be about dealing with his father's death the previous year. In an interview with Reuters, he stated that: "this record’s gonna be about my father and how he died, and how he lived, and everything I found out about him. That’s the only thing I can really write about. It’s gonna be about him … and about the people I love".

On 9 October 2019, the band announced that founding member, Joji Malani, would be leaving the band. He played his last gig with Gang of Youths opening for Mumford & Sons in Oklahoma City on 11 October 2019. He was replaced by multi- instrumentalist, Tom Hobden, formerly of Noah and the Whale and a touring member of Mumford & Sons. Hobden played his first gig with the band on 17 February 2020 at Omeara in London.

In October 2020, the band began posting footage to Instagram of them recording their as-yet-untitled third album. A self- produced single, "The Angel of 8th Ave" was released on 15 June 2021, and it was announced that an EP was due for release in July 2021. In an interview with NME, Le'aupepe said that they had "scrapped 2 versions of the album," and it would be released "at some point in the next year or so". A three-track EP, total serene, was released on 16 July 2021.

On 10 November 2021, the band announced their third album Angel in Realtime, which was released on 25 February 2022, alongside a world tour and single, "Tend The Garden". On 1 December 2021, the band's performance on The Late Show with Stephen Colbert aired, where they premiered the song, “The Angel of 8th Ave".

On 20 May 2022, the band surprise released their third EP, Immolation Tape. It contains three early demos of songs on Angel in Realtime – "In the Wake of Your Leave", "Forbearance" and "Spirit Boy", as well as a cover of "Shot in the Arm" by Wilco.

Band members 
Current members
 David Le'aupepe – lead vocals, rhythm guitar, piano (2011–present) 
 Jung Kim – keyboards, piano (2012–present), lead guitar (2019–present), rhythm guitar (2012–2019)
 Max Dunn – bass guitar, backing vocals (2012–present), keyboards (2017–present)
 Donnie Borzestowski – drums (2014–present), backing vocals (2017–present) 
 Tom Hobden – violin, rhythm guitar, keyboards (2020–present)

Current touring musicians
 Louis Giannamore – percussion, guitars, piano (2021–present)

Former members
 Sam O'Donnell – drums (2012–2014)
 Joji Malani – lead guitar, backing vocals (2012–2019)

Former touring musicians
 James Larter – percussion, marimba (2021–2022)
 Gretta Ray – backing vocals (2022)
 Simon Matafai – backing vocals, piano (2022)

Timeline

Discography
Studio albums
 The Positions (2015)
 Go Farther in Lightness (2017)
 Angel in Realtime (2022)
Live albums

 MTV Unplugged (Live in Melbourne) (2018)

Extended plays

 Let Me Be Clear (2016)
 Total Serene (2021)
 Immolation Tape (2022)
 Triple J Like a Version Sessions (2022)

Awards

APRA Awards
The APRA Awards are held in Australia and New Zealand by the Australasian Performing Right Association to recognise songwriting skills, sales and airplay performance by its members annually. They commenced in 1982.

! 
|-
| 2018
| "What Can I Do if the Fire Goes Out" 
| Song of the Year
| 
|
|-
| 2019
| "The Deepest Sighs, the Frankest Shadows"
| Rock Work of the Year
| 
| 
|-
| rowspan="2"| 2022
| rowspan="2"| "The Angel of 8th Avenue"
| Most Performed Rock Work
| 
| 
|-
| Song of the Year
| 
| 
|-

ARIA Music Awards

The ARIA Music Awards is an annual awards ceremony that recognises excellence, innovation, and achievement across all genres of Australian music. Gang of Youths have won 4 awards from 20 nominations.

|-
|rowspan="5"| 2015  
|rowspan="3"| The Positions 
| Breakthrough Artist 
| 
|-
| Best Rock Album 
| 
|-
| Best Cover Art 
|  
|-
| Gang of Youths National Tour
| Best Australian Live Act
|  
|-
| "Radioface"
| Engineer of the Year
| 
|-
|rowspan="2"| 2016  
| Let Me Be Clear 
| Best Rock Album 
| 
|-
| Gang of Youths National Tour 
| Best Australian Live Act
| 
|-
|rowspan="8"| 2017  
|rowspan="4"| Go Farther in Lightness 
| Album of the Year 
| 
|-
| Best Group 
| 
|-
| Best Rock Album 
| 
|-
| Best Cover Art 
| 
|-
| Gang of Youths & Adrian Breakspear – Go Farther in Lightness
| Producer of the Year 
| 
|-
| Adrian Breakspear – Go Farther in Lightness
| Engineer of the Year
| 
|-
| Daniel and Jared Daperis – "The Deepest Sighs, the Frankest Shadows"
| Best Video
| 
|-
| Gang of Youths
| Best Australian Live Act
| 
|-
|rowspan="2"| 2018  
| Gang of Youths 2017 National Tour
| Best Australian Live Act 
| 
|-
| Patrick Rohl for Gang of Youths – "The Heart Is a Muscle"
| Best Video
| 
|-
|rowspan="2"| 2019  
| MTV Unplugged (Live in Melbourne)
| Best Original Soundtrack or Musical Theatre Cast Album
| 
|-
| Say Yes to Life Tour
| Best Australian Live Act 
| 
|-
| 2021
| "The Angel of 8th Ave."
| Best Group
| 
|-
|rowspan="4"| 2022
| rowspan="3"| Angel in Realtime.
| Album of the Year
| 
|-
| Best Group
| 
|-
| Best Rock Album
| 
|-
| Angel in Realtime. Tour
| Best Australian Live Act
| 
|-

Helpmann Awards
The Helpmann Awards is an awards show, celebrating live entertainment and performing arts in Australia, presented by industry group Live Performance Australia since 2001. Note: 2020 and 2021 were cancelled due to the COVID-19 pandemic.
 

! 
|-
| 2018
| Australia 2017
| Helpmann Award for Best Australian Contemporary Concert
| 
|
|-

J Awards
The J Awards are an annual series of Australian music awards that were established by the Australian Broadcasting Corporation's youth-focused radio station Triple J. They commenced in 2005.

! 
|-
| 2015
| The Positions
| Australian Album of the Year
| 
|
|-
| 2017
| Go Farther in Lightness
| Australian Album of the Year
| 
| 
|-
| 2022
| angel in realtime.
|Australian Album of the Year
| 
| 
|-

National Live Music Awards
The National Live Music Awards (NLMAs) are a broad recognition of Australia's diverse live industry, celebrating the success of the Australian live scene. The awards commenced in 2016.

|-
| rowspan="3" | National Live Music Awards of 2016
| rowspan="2" | themselves
| Live Act of the Year
| 
|-
| NSW Live Act of the Year
| 
|-
| David Le'aupepe (Gang of Youths)
| Live Voice of the Year
| 
|-
| rowspan="5" | National Live Music Awards of 2017
| rowspan="3" | themselves
| Live Act of the Year
| 
|-
| People's Choice - Live Act of the Year
| 
|-
| NSW Live Act of the Year
| 
|-
| David Le'aupepe (Gang of Youths)
| Live Voice of the Year
| 
|-
| Joji Malani (Gang of Youths)
| Live Guitarist of the Year
| 
|-
| rowspan="2" | National Live Music Awards of 2018
| rowspan="2" | themselves
| International Live Achievement (Band)
| 
|-
| NSW Live Act of the Year
| 
|-
| National Live Music Awards of 2019
| themselves
| International Live Achievement (Band)
|

Rolling Stone Australia Awards
The Rolling Stone Australia Awards are awarded annually in January or February by the Australian edition of Rolling Stone magazine for outstanding contributions to popular culture in the previous year.

! 
|-
| 2022
| "The Angel of 8th Ave."
| Best Single
| 
| 
|-
|rowspan="2"| 2023
| angel in realtime
| Best Record
| 
|rowspan="2"| 
|-
| Gang of Youths
| Rolling Stone Global Award
| 
|-

Vanda & Young Global Songwriting Competition
The Vanda & Young Global Songwriting Competition is an annual competition that "acknowledges great songwriting whilst supporting and raising money for Nordoff-Robbins" and is coordinated by Albert Music and APRA AMCOS. It commenced in 2009.

|-
| 2014
| "Poison Drum" (David Le'aupepe)
| Vanda & Young Global Songwriting Competition
| style="background:tan;"| 3rd
|-
| rowspan="2" | 2018
| "Let Me Down Easy" (David Le'aupepe)
| Vanda & Young Global Songwriting Competition
| style="background:silver;"| 2nd
|-
| "The Heart Is a Muscle" (David Le'aupepe)
| Vanda & Young Global Songwriting Competition
| style="background:tan;"| 3rd

Triple J Hottest 100 and 200 performance 
Gang of Youths have appeared in almost every annual Triple J Hottest 100 countdown since 2015. Notably, in the 2017 countdown, the band had three tracks poll in the top 10, a feat only previously achieved by Chet Faker (2014) and Powderfinger (2003).

Bold indicates the track polled in the top 100.

References

External links
 

2010 establishments in Australia
ARIA Award winners
Australian hard rock musical groups
Musical groups established in 2010
Musical groups from Sydney
Sony Music Australia artists